The University of Jammu informally known as Jammu University (JU), accredited as A+ grade by National Assessment and Accreditation Council (NAAC), was established in 1969 by an act of the state legislature which effectively split the Jammu and Kashmir University into the separate University of Jammu and University of Kashmir.

The university is currently located at the foothills of Trikuta on the banks of the Tawi River. The university has set up seven off-site campuses at Bhaderwah, Kishtwar, Poonch, Reasi, Ramnagar, Kathua and Udhampur. The university is the first university in India to receive the ISO-9001 certification. The university offers undergraduate, postgraduate and doctoral programs. It also affiliates and recognizes colleges.

Campus 

The main campus of Jammu University is situated at Baba Saheb Ambedkar Road in Jammu at an altitude of 1030  ft above sea level. The main campus of the university houses the teaching departments, health centre, guest house, post office, Jammu & Kashmir Bank, bookshop, hostels, cafeteria and canteens and many other facilities. The second campus of the university (the old campus) is spread over 10.5 acres which are located at a distance of 4  km from the main campus and currently has residential quarters for teaching and non-teaching employees and three hostels for boys.

Organisation and administration 
The lieutenant governor of the J&K UT is the chancellor. The university has 36 departments and 157 affiliated colleges, awarding degrees in more than 50 programmes at the postgraduate and undergraduate levels.

Faculties and departments 
The University of Jammu has 11 faculties and 36 academic departments which offer courses in a wide variety of subjects and concentrations.

 Faculty of Life Sciences
 School of Biotechnology
 Institute of Human Genetics
        Department of Botany
        Department of Environmental Science
        Department of Zoology
 Department of biochemistry
Department of Microbiology
 Faculty of Arts/Oriental Languages
 Department of Buddhist Studies 
        Department of Dogri 
        Department of English 
        Department of Hindi 
        Department of Punjabi 
        Department of Sanskrit
        Department of Urdu

 Faculty of Sciences
 Department of Chemistry 
        Department of Geology
        Department of Geography 
        Department of Home Science 
        Department of Physics & Electronics
        Department of Remote Sensing & GIS

 Faculty of Education
 Department of Education
        Department of Physical Education

 Faculty of Business Studies
 The Business School
         School of Hospitality & Tourism Management
         International Centre for Cross-Cultural Research and Human Resource Management
         Department of Commerce 
 
 Faculty of Mathematical Science
 Department of Mathematics
        Department of Statistics
        Department of Computer Science & IT

 Faculty of Law
        Department of Law 
        The Law School

 Faculty of Social Science
 Department of Economics 
        Department of History
        Department of Political Science
        Department of Library and Information Science
        Department of Psychology
        Department for Strategic and Regional Studies
        Department of Sociology
        Department of Life Long Learning

 Faculty of Medicine
 Faculty of Engineering 
 Faculty of Music and Fine Arts

Academics

Ranking 

The university was ranked 52 among Indian universities by the National Institutional Ranking Framework (NIRF) in 2020 and 90 in the overall ranking.

Library

Dhanvantri Library 

The Dhanvantri Library, the central library of the university, is a 3-storied building having an area of 60,000 square feet. It offers about 5 lakh books, journals, and 250 current periodicals, etc. on a variety of subjects that caters to the needs of the students, teachers, and researchers. The library has large reading halls which can easily accommodate about 500 users. Most of the library has been computerized. A special technology, RIFD technology, is used for security purposes in the library.

Departmental libraries 
Almost all departments run their own departmental libraries. These libraries provide a wide spectrum of Journals in addition to books to the students.

Health centre 
A first-aid centre was initially established in the premises of the boys' hostels of the university managed by a part-time medical assistant. Later, the first aid centre was upgraded to a full-fledged health centre in the early 170s to provide medical aid benefits to the university community and the dependents of the university employees.

Auditorium 
The Dogri Sanstha and KVM TRUST are getting a huge auditorium built at Dogri Bhawan, Karan Nagar, Jammu. The Kunwar Viyogi Auditorium will be a hub of art and culture, a centre for the confluence of poets, artists, writers, art connoisseurs, patrons and for youth. Dogri Sanstha in collaboration with The Dogri Department is working to preserve and promote the language and culture of Duggars. The Auditorium was being inaugurated by Dr Jitendra Singh Hon’ble Union Minister Of State on 15 September 2019.

Notable alumni and facilities

Notable alumni 

 Ghulam Nabi Azad is an Indian politician of the Indian National Congress, 7th Chief Minister of Jammu and Kashmir and was the Minister of Health and Family Welfare. Presently, he serves as the Leader of opposition in Rajya Sabha.
 Dr Nirmal Singh is an Indian politician of Bharatiya Janata Party. He was the Deputy Chief Minister  of erstwhile State of Jammu and Kashmir and Speaker of Jammu and Kashmir Legislative Assembly. Singh did his PhD from the university in 1988 and joined as the lecturer of Modern History, Department of History in 1989. He retired as a professor in 2017.
 Justice T. S. Thakur  was the 43rd Chief Justice of India.
 Jamyang Tsering Namgyal, Member of Parliament, Lok Sabha from Ladakh constituency
 Chowdhary Zulfkar Ali is an Indian Politician and was Minister for Education in the State. Presently, he is a senior leader of Jammu and Kashmir Apni Party.
Rehan Katrawale

Abhishek Singh Rajput, better known as Rehan Katrawale (born 19 January 2001) is an Indian Actor, Writer and Poet from Katra, Jammu and Kashmir. Known for his contribution in the world of cinema, Rehan also holds an Honours Degree in Psychology from University of Jammu. Rehan Katrawale worked in a number of films and short films like Death Slayer 2, Paradox, Godfather, SpyUniverse and many more.
 Shahnawaz Choudhary
 Aarti Tikoo Singh, a journalist in The Times of India, conflict and international affairs writer and former reporter
 Permod Kohli, Chief Justice of Sikkim High Court
Mohit Raina

Mohit Raina is an Indian Actor known for portraying the role of Mahadev in Devo ke Dev Mahadev. In addition to this he had worked in a number or bollywood films. He was born in Jammu and Kashmir and studied under University of Jammu.

References

External links 
 Official website

 
Universities in Jammu and Kashmir
Educational institutions established in 1969
Education in Jammu (city)
1969 establishments in Jammu and Kashmir
Jammu district